Hakataramea, spelt Hakateramea in some older sources, is a rural village located in the southern Canterbury region of New Zealand's South Island.  It is in the Waimate District and sits on the north bank of the Waitaki River at its confluence with the Hakataramea River.

Several small communities are located in the Waihaorunga rural area, to the north of Hakataramea. The community of Douglas, settled in 1911, has a population of about 20 people. Waihao Downs, on State Highway 82, was the terminus on Waimate Rail Branch, from 4 April 1884 until 11 December 1953.

History 

The area in and around Hakataramea was leased by the New Zealand and Australia Land Company in the 1860s and freehold settlement began in 1878.  On 7 November 1881, a combined road/rail bridge from Kurow to Hakataramea across the Waitaki River was opened.  The bridge carried the Kurow Branch railway into Hakataramea, and this branch line provided an economically valuable connection to the Main South Line, from which it diverged in Pukeuri, north of Oamaru.  Plans existed to extend the line beyond Hakataramea up the Hakataramea River valley to a proposed town that would have been home to 10,000 people, but neither town nor railway extension were ever built.  Railway services consisted of mixed trains hauled by steam locomotives.  Due to low traffic and the closeness of the more significant Kurow railway station, the 1.76 km of trackage between Kurow and Hakataramea closed on 14 July 1930. The road/rail bridge into Hakataramea is now road only and carries  State Highway 82.

In World War I, eight soldiers from Hakataramea were killed.  A small square obelisk now stands in Hakataramea as a memorial.

Demographics

Hakataramea had a population of 831 at the 2018 New Zealand census, an increase of 75 people (9.9%) since the 2013 census, and an increase of 99 people (13.5%) since the 2006 census. There were 327 households. There were 426 males and 405 females, giving a sex ratio of 1.05 males per female. The median age was 42.1 years (compared with 37.4 years nationally), with 174 people (20.9%) aged under 15 years, 102 (12.3%) aged 15 to 29, 420 (50.5%) aged 30 to 64, and 135 (16.2%) aged 65 or older.

Ethnicities were 93.5% European/Pākehā, 4.0% Māori, 1.1% Pacific peoples, 3.2% Asian, and 1.8% other ethnicities (totals add to more than 100% since people could identify with multiple ethnicities).

The proportion of people born overseas was 12.6%, compared with 27.1% nationally.

Although some people objected to giving their religion, 50.5% had no religion, 39.0% were Christian, 0.7% were Buddhist and 0.4% had other religions.

Of those at least 15 years old, 87 (13.2%) people had a bachelor or higher degree, and 123 (18.7%) people had no formal qualifications. The median income was $32,200, compared with $31,800 nationally. 84 people (12.8%) earned over $70,000 compared to 17.2% nationally. The employment status of those at least 15 was that 381 (58.0%) people were employed full-time, 114 (17.4%) were part-time, and 9 (1.4%) were unemployed.

References 

Waimate District
Populated places in Canterbury, New Zealand